The 1994–95 FA Trophy was the twenty-sixth season of the FA Trophy.

Preliminary round
The matches (no including replays) were played on September 3, 1994.

Ties

Replays

First qualifying round
The matches (no including replays) were played on September 17, 1994.

Ties

Replays

2nd replays

Second qualifying round
The matches (no including replays) were played on October 15, 1994.

Ties

Replays

Third qualifying round
The matches (no including replays) were played on November 26, 1994.

Ties

Replays

2nd replay

1st round
The teams that given byes to this round are Woking, Kidderminster Harriers, Kettering Town, Southport, Runcorn, Dagenham & Redbridge, Macclesfield Town, Dover Athletic, Stafford Rangers, Altrincham, Gateshead, Bath City, Halifax Town, Stalybridge Celtic, Northwich Victoria, Welling United, Telford United, Bromsgrove Rovers, Yeovil Town, Merthyr Tydfil, Farnborough Town, Stevenage Borough, Slough Town, Witton Albion, Marine, Morecambe, Sutton United, Bishop Auckland, Guiseley, Enfield, Durham City and Billingham Synthonia. The matches (no including replays) were played on January 21, 1995.

Ties

Replays

2nd replays

2nd round
The matches (no including replays) were played on February 11, 1995.

Ties

Replays

3rd round
The matches (no including replays) were played on March 4, 1995.

Ties

Replays

4th round
The matches (no including replays) were played on March 25, 1995.

Ties

Replays

Semi finals
The first legs were played on April 8, 1995, and the second legs the next week later (April 15).

First leg

Second leg

Final
The match was played on May 14, 1995, at Wembley Stadium.

Tie

References

General
 Football Club History Database: FA Trophy 1994-95

Specific

1994–95 domestic association football cups
League
1994-95